HMAS Wollongong (J172), named for the city of Wollongong, New South Wales, was one of 60 s constructed during World War II and one of 20 built for the Admiralty but manned by personnel of and commissioned into the Royal Australian Navy (RAN).

Design and construction

In 1938, the Australian Commonwealth Naval Board (ACNB) identified the need for a general purpose 'local defence vessel' capable of both anti-submarine and mine-warfare duties, while easy to construct and operate. Construction of the prototype  did not go ahead, but the plans were retained. The need for locally built 'all-rounder' vessels at the start of World War II saw the "Australian Minesweepers" (designated as such to hide their anti-submarine capability, but popularly referred to as "corvettes") approved in September 1939, with 60 constructed during the course of the war: 36 ordered by the RAN, 20 (including Wollongong) ordered by the British Admiralty but manned and commissioned as RAN vessels, and 4 for the Royal Indian Navy.

Wollongong was laid down by Cockatoo Docks & Engineering Company on 29 January 1941. She was launched on 5 July 1941, by the wife of Jack Beasley, then Minister for Supply and Shipping, and was commissioned into the RAN on 23 October 1941.

Operational history

World War II
After entering active service, Wollongong was deployed as a convoy escort in Australian waters. On 11 January 1942, she was sent to Singapore. The corvette was involved in patrols and the evacuation of Allied personnel from Malaya, Java, and Sumatra, and was the last Australian ship to leave Singapore before it was surrendered to the Japanese on 15 February. She then provided a rear escort to a convoy fleeing Tanjong Priok, Batavia. During this, Wollongong, stood by the tanker , which ran aground and eventually had to be abandoned, was forced to sink the minesweeper , which attempted to turn back to the captured port, and broke off from the convoy to escort the damaged SS British Judge, which was torpedoed on the night of 28 February and could not keep up. The main convoy and the escorting sloop  was sunk on 4 March by a Japanese cruiser group.

Wollongong was then ordered to Fremantle, where she served as an escort ship before sailing on 14 September to Diego Garcia to join the British Eastern Fleet. She operated in the Indian Ocean, Persian Gulf, Arabian Sea, and Mediterranean as a convoy escort and patrol vessel, and twice entered the Atlantic Ocean to meet Mediterranean-bound convoys. In September 1943, while in the Mediterranean, Wollongong was called on to shell the beached German submarine U-617, and was awarded partial credit for the submarine's destruction.

Wollongong returned to Australian waters in February 1945, then was assigned to the British Pacific Fleet. The corvette was involved in the Battle of Okinawa. After the end of World War II, Wollongong was sent to the Far East, where she was involved in anti-piracy patrols, before returning to Australia at the end of 1945.

The ship received six battle honours for her wartime service: "Pacific 1942–45", "Indian Ocean 1942–45", "Sicily 1943", "Mediterranean 1943", "East Indies 1943", and "Okinawa 1945".

RNLN service
After the end of the war, Wollongong was marked for transfer to the Royal Netherlands Navy (RNLN). She was decommissioned in Sydney on 11 February 1946, was recommissioned into the RNLN, and renamed HNLMS Banda.

The corvette remained with the RNLN until April 1950.

TNI-AL service
The ship was transferred to the new Indonesian Navy in April 1950, and was renamed KRI Radjawali.

The corvette left service in early 1968, and was scrapped in Hong Kong.

Citations

References

Books

Journal and news articles

External links

Bathurst-class corvettes of the Royal Australian Navy
Ships built in New South Wales
1941 ships
World War II corvettes of Australia
Bathurst-class corvettes of the Indonesian Navy